Houyet is a municipality of Wallonia in the province of Namur, Belgium. 

On 1 January 2006 the municipality had 4,485 inhabitants. The total area is 122.31 km², giving a population density of 37 inhabitants per km².

The municipality consists of the following districts: Celles, Ciergnon, Custinne, Finnevaux, Hour, Houyet, Hulsonniaux, Mesnil-Église, Mesnil-Saint-Blaise, and Wanlin.

Town twins 
  Rasteau (since 1991)

Image gallery

See also 
 List of protected heritage sites in Houyet

References

External links 
 
  (in French)

Municipalities of Namur (province)